Donald Trump (born 1946) is an American politician, media personality, and businessman who served as the 45th president of the United States from 2017 to 2021.

Donald Trump may also refer to:


People 
 Donald Trump Jr. (born 1977), American businessman and first child of President Donald Trump
 Donald L. Trump (born 1945), American oncologist

Songs 
 "Donald Trump" (song), a 2011 single by rapper Mac Miller
 "Donald Trump", a 2018 single by Lil Nas X
 "Donald Trump (Black Version)", a song by The Time from the 1990 album Pandemonium

Other uses 
 "Donald Trump" (Last Week Tonight with John Oliver), a February 28, 2016, segment on the news satire program Last Week Tonight with John Oliver

See also 

 Presidency of Donald Trump, his presidency
 List of things named after Donald Trump
 Trump (disambiguation)
 Donald Crump (1933–2011), commissioner of the Canadian Football League
 Jeff Trachta (born 1960), actor and singer who appeared as "The Singing Trump" on America's Got Talent (season 12)